The 73rd Academy Awards ceremony, presented by the Academy of Motion Picture Arts and Sciences (AMPAS), honored the best of 2000 in film and took place on March 25, 2001, at the Shrine Auditorium in Los Angeles, beginning at 5:30 p.m. PST / 8:30 p.m. EST. During the ceremony, AMPAS presented Academy Awards (commonly referred to as Oscars) in 23 categories. The ceremony, televised in the United States by ABC, was produced by Gil Cates and was directed by Louis J. Horvitz. Actor Steve Martin hosted the show for the first time. Three weeks earlier in a ceremony at the Regent Beverly Wilshire Hotel in Beverly Hills, California held on March 3, the Academy Awards for Technical Achievement were presented by host Renée Zellweger.

Gladiator won five awards, including Best Picture. Other winners included Crouching Tiger, Hidden Dragon and Traffic with four awards and Almost Famous, Big Mama, Erin Brockovich, Father and Daughter, How the Grinch Stole Christmas, Into the Arms of Strangers: Stories of the Kindertransport, Pollock, Quiero Ser, U-571, and Wonder Boys with one. The telecast garnered almost 43 million viewers in the United States.

Winners and nominees
The nominees for the 73rd Academy Awards were announced on February 13, 2001, by Robert Rehme, president of the Academy, and Academy Award-winning actress Kathy Bates. Gladiator received the most nominations with twelve. Crouching Tiger, Hidden Dragon came in second with ten.

The winners were announced during the awards ceremony on March 25, 2001. Gladiator became the first film to win Best Picture without a directing or screenwriting win since 1949's All the King's Men. Best Director winner Steven Soderbergh, who received nominations for both Erin Brockovich and Traffic (for which he won the award), was the third person to receive double directing nominations in the same year. Crouching Tiger, Hidden Dragon became the third film nominated simultaneously for Best Picture and Best Foreign Language Film in the same year. Moreover, its ten nominations were the most for a foreign language film. With four wins, the film is tied with Fanny and Alexander and Parasite as the most awarded foreign language films in Academy Awards history. By virtue of his brother's Best Supporting Actor nomination for 1988's Running on Empty, Best Supporting Actor nominee Joaquin Phoenix and River became the first pair of brothers to earn acting nominations.

Awards

Winners are listed first, highlighted in boldface, and indicated with a double dagger.

{| class=wikitable role="presentation"
|-
| valign="top" width="50%"| 
 Gladiator – Douglas Wick, David Franzoni, and Branko Lustig, producersChocolat – David Brown, Kit Golden, and Leslie Holleran, producers
 Crouching Tiger, Hidden Dragon – Bill Kong, Hsu Li-kong, and Ang Lee, producers
 Erin Brockovich – Danny DeVito, Michael Shamberg, and Stacey Sher, producers
 Traffic – Marshall Herskovitz, Edward Zwick, and Laura Bickford, producers
| valign="top" width="50%"| 
 Steven Soderbergh – Traffic
 Stephen Daldry – Billy Elliot
 Ang Lee – Crouching Tiger, Hidden Dragon
 Steven Soderbergh – Erin Brockovich
 Ridley Scott – Gladiator
|-
| valign="top" width="50%"| 
 Russell Crowe – Gladiator as General Maximus Decimus Meridius
 Javier Bardem – Before Night Falls as Reinaldo Arenas
 Tom Hanks – Cast Away as Chuck Noland
 Ed Harris – Pollock as Jackson Pollock
 Geoffrey Rush – Quills as the Marquis de Sade
| valign="top" width="50%"|
 Julia Roberts – Erin Brockovich as Erin Brockovich
 Joan Allen – The Contender as Laine Hanson
 Juliette Binoche – Chocolat as Vianne Rocher
 Ellen Burstyn – Requiem for a Dream as Sara Goldfarb
 Laura Linney – You Can Count on Me as Sammy Prescott
|-
| valign="top" width="50%"| 
 Benicio del Toro – Traffic as Javier Rodriguez
 Jeff Bridges – The Contender as President Jackson Evans
 Willem Dafoe – Shadow of the Vampire as Max Schreck
 Albert Finney – Erin Brockovich as Edward L. Masry
 Joaquin Phoenix – Gladiator as Commodus
| valign="top" width="50%"| 
 Marcia Gay Harden – Pollock as Lee Krasner
 Judi Dench – Chocolat as Armande Voizin
 Kate Hudson – Almost Famous as Penny Lane
 Frances McDormand – Almost Famous as Elaine Miller
 Julie Walters – Billy Elliot as Miss Wilkinson
|-
| valign="top" width="50%"| 
 Almost Famous – Cameron Crowe
Billy Elliot – Lee Hall
 Erin Brockovich – Susannah Grant
 Gladiator – David Franzoni, John Logan, and William Nicholson
 You Can Count on Me – Kenneth Lonergan
| valign="top" width="50%"|
 Traffic – Stephen Gaghan based on the British TV series Traffik created by Simon MooreChocolat – Robert Nelson Jacobs based on the novel by Joanne Harris
 Crouching Tiger, Hidden Dragon – James Schamus, Hui-Ling Wang, and Kuo Jung Tsai based on the book by Wang Dulu
 O Brother, Where Art Thou? – Joel Coen and Ethan Coen based on the Odyssey by Homer
 Wonder Boys – Steve Kloves based on the novel by Michael Chabon
|-
| valign="top" width="50%"| 
 Crouching Tiger, Hidden Dragon (Taiwan) in Mandarin – Ang Lee Amores Perros (Mexico) in Spanish – Alejandro González Iñárritu
 Divided We Fall (Czech Republic) in Czech – Jan Hřebejk
 Everybody's Famous! (Belgium) in Dutch and English – Dominique Deruddere
 The Taste of Others (France) in French – Agnès Jaoui
| valign="top" width="50%"| 
 Into the Arms of Strangers: Stories of the Kindertransport – Mark Jonathan Harris and Deborah Oppenheimer Legacy – Tod Lending
 Long Night's Journey into Day – Frances Reid and Deborah Hoffmann
 Scottsboro: An American Tragedy – Barak Goodman and Daniel Anker
 Sound and Fury – Josh Aronson and Roger Weisberg
|-
| valign="top" width="50%"| 
 Big Mama – Tracy Seretean Curtain Call – Chuck Braverman and Steve Kalafer
 Dolphins – Greg MacGillivray and Alec Lorimore
 The Man on Lincoln's Nose – Daniel Raim
 On Tiptoe: Gentle Steps to Freedom – Eric Simonson and Leelai Demoz
| valign="top" width="50%"| 
 Quiero ser (I want to be...) – Florian Gallenberger By Courier – Peter Riegert and Ericka Frederick
 One Day Crossing – Joan Stein and Christina Lazaridi
 Seraglio – Gail Lerner and Colin Campbell
 A Soccer Story – Paulo Machline
|-
| valign="top" width="50%"| 
 Father and Daughter – Michaël Dudok de Wit Periwig Maker – Steffen Schäffler and Annette Schäffler
 Rejected – Don Hertzfeldt
| valign="top" width="50%"| 
 Crouching Tiger, Hidden Dragon – Tan Dun Chocolat – Rachel Portman
 Gladiator – Hans Zimmer
 Malèna – Ennio Morricone
 The Patriot – John Williams
|-
| valign="top" | 
 "Things Have Changed" from Wonder Boys – Music and Lyrics by Bob Dylan "A Fool In Love" from Meet the Parents – Music and Lyrics by Randy Newman
 "I've Seen It All" from Dancer in the Dark – Music by Björk; Lyrics by Lars von Trier and Sjón Sigurðsson
 "A Love Before Time" from Crouching Tiger, Hidden Dragon – Music by Jorge Calandrelli and Tan Dun; Lyrics by James Schamus
 "My Funny Friend and Me" from The Emperor's New Groove – Music by Sting and David Hartley; Lyrics by Sting
| valign="top" width="50%"| 
 U-571 – Jon Johnson Space Cowboys – Alan Robert Murray and Bub Asman
|-
| valign="top" | 
 Gladiator – Scott Millan, Bob Beemer, and Ken WestonCast Away – Randy Thom, Tom Johnson, Dennis Sands, and William B. Kaplan
 The Patriot – Kevin O'Connell, Greg P. Russell, and Lee Orloff
 The Perfect Storm – John Reitz, Gregg Rudloff, David Campbell, and Keith A. Wester
 U-571  – Steve Maslow, Gregg Landaker, Rick Kline, and Ivan Sharrock
| valign="top" width="50%"| 
 Crouching Tiger, Hidden Dragon – Art Direction and Set Decoration: Timmy Yip Gladiator – Art Direction: Arthur Max; Set Decoration: Crispian Sallis
 How the Grinch Stole Christmas – Art Direction: Michael Corenblith; Set Decoration: Merideth Boswell
 Quills – Art Direction: Martin Childs; Set Decoration: Jill Quertier
 Vatel – Art Direction: Jean Rabasse; Set Decoration: Françoise Benoît-Fresco
|-
| valign="top" width="50%"| 
 Crouching Tiger, Hidden Dragon – Peter Pau Gladiator – John Mathieson
 Malèna – Lajos Koltai
 O Brother, Where Art Thou? – Roger Deakins
 The Patriot – Caleb Deschanel
| valign="top" width="50%"| 
 How the Grinch Stole Christmas – Rick Baker and Gail Rowell-Ryan The Cell – Michèle Burke and Edouard Henriques
 Shadow of the Vampire – Ann Buchanan and Amber Sibley
|-
| valign="top" width="50%"| 
 Gladiator – Janty Yates 102 Dalmatians – Anthony Powell
 Crouching Tiger, Hidden Dragon – Timmy Yip
 How the Grinch Stole Christmas – Rita Ryack
 Quills – Jacqueline West
| valign="top" width="50%"| 
 Traffic – Stephen Mirrione Almost Famous – Joe Hutshing and Saar Klein
 Crouching Tiger, Hidden Dragon – Tim Squyres
 Gladiator – Pietro Scalia
 Wonder Boys – Dede Allen
|-
| colspan="2" valign="top" width="50%"| 

 Gladiator'' – John Nelson, Neil Corbould, Tim Burke, and Rob HarveyHollow Man – Scott E. Anderson, Craig Hayes, Scott Stokdyk, and Stan Parks
 The Perfect Storm – Stefen Fangmeier, Habib Zargarpour, John Frazier, and Walt Conti
|}

Academy Honorary Awards
Jack Cardiff
Ernest Lehman

Irving G. Thalberg Award
Dino De Laurentiis

Films with multiple nominations and awards

The following 20 films received multiple nominations:

The following three films received multiple awards:

Presenters and performers
The following individuals, listed in order of appearance, presented awards or performed musical numbers.

Presenters

Performers

Ceremony information

Despite earning both critical praise and increased viewership from last year's ceremony, actor Billy Crystal announced that he would not host the ceremony for a second consecutive year. He listed his role in the film America's Sweethearts and his directing and producing duties for the made-for-television film 61* as obstacles preventing him from reprising his role as emcee. Shortly after being selected as producer for the awards gala, Gil Cates hired actor and comedian Steve Martin as host for the 2001 telecast. Cates explained his choice of Martin as host saying, "He's a movie star, he's funny, he's classy, he's literate — he'll be a wonderful host." Additionally, AMPAS president Robert Rehme approved of the selection stating, "Steve is a man of great style. I am simply elated to have him on board. He was at the top of our list, we offered and he accepted; it was as simple as that." Martin expressed his delight in hosting the gala jokingly retorting, "If you can't win 'em, join 'em."

In view of the gala taking place in the year 2001, Cates christened the show with a theme saluting the Stanley Kubrick science fiction film 2001: A Space Odyssey. In tandem with the theme, astronauts Susan J. Helms, Yury Usachov, and James S. Voss who were inside the International Space Station Alpha Destiny module during Expedition 2 appeared at the beginning of the telecast via satellite to introduce host Martin. Throughout the broadcast, the orchestra conducted by film composer Bill Conti performed a remixed version of "Also Sprach Zarathustra (2001)" composed by Brazilian jazz musician Eumir Deodato. Furthermore, 2001 author Arthur C. Clarke presented the Best Adapted Screenplay award from his home in Sri Lanka.

Several others participated in the production of the ceremony. Production designer Roy Christopher designed a new stage for the show which featured gigantic louvered cove that curved from the stage floor to the ceiling via the auditorium's backstage wall. Many media outlets described the set design resembling a cross section of a space capsule. In addition, four stainless steel arcs each carved with a silhouette of the Oscar statuette were flanked at the front and back of the stage allowing presenters and winners to pass through them. Dancer Debbie Allen choreographed the performances of the Best Original Song nominees. Musicians Yo-Yo Ma and Itzhak Perlman performed excerpts from the five nominees for Best Original Score.

Box office performance of nominees
Before the nominees were announced on February 13, the combined gross of the five Best Picture nominees was $471 million with an average of $94 million per film. Gladiator was the highest earner among the Best Picture nominees with $186.6 million in domestic box office receipts. The film was followed by Erin Brockovich ($125.5 million), Traffic ($71.2 million), Crouching Tiger, Hidden Dragon ($60.7 million) and finally, Chocolat ($27 million).

Of the top 50 grossing movies of the year, 49 nominations went to 15 films on the list. Only Cast Away (3rd), Gladiator (4th), Erin Brockovich (12th), Traffic (31st), and Crouching Tiger, Hidden Dragon (41st) directing, acting, screenwriting, or Best Picture. The other top 50 box office hits that earned nominations were Dr. Seuss' How the Grinch Stole Christmas (1st), The Perfect Storm (5th), Meet the Parents (7th), The Patriot (17th), Space Cowboys (23rd), The Emperor's New Groove (25th), U-571 (26th), Hollow Man (30th), 102 Dalmatians (38th), and The Cell (40th).

Critical reviews
The show received a positive reception from most media outlets. Television critic Ken Tucker of Entertainment Weekly wrote, "As host, Martin was typically dapper and comfortably low-key, pacing himself throughout the evening." He also added, "The Oscars seemed as bouncy and well oiled as Russell Crowe's 'do—a '50s Gene Vincent-style quiff that made for a cool rock & roll segue into Dylan's Best Song performance." USA Today critic Robert Bianco gave an average review of the telecast but commended the host stating, "Martin was a droll delight — as amusing as Oscar star Billy Crystal, but in an entirely different way. Where Crystal was all hard work and good humor, the more deadpan and deceptively proper Martin let his nastier jokes sneak up on you." Tom Shales from The Washington Post commented Martin was "the best Oscar host since Johnny Carson." In addition, he quipped that "The show was almost too dignified for its own good, yet it remained exciting and entertaining even at its loftier and more pretentious moments."

Some media outlets were more critical of the show. Barry Garron of The Hollywood Reporter commented, "Here was veteran producer Gil Cates presiding over one of the few Academy Award presentations that ended on time and still managed to be too long." Additionally, he quipped "If nothing else, tonight's show proved that, despite the many Awards most viewers have no interest in, the show can be done in three and a half hours." The Atlanta Journal-Constitution columnist Steve Murray remarked, "It wasn't just that Martin lacked the impish, insider energy of Billy Crystal – or even Whoopi Goldberg's hypnotically awful self-satisfaction. No, the 73rd annual Academy Awards still seemed to go on forever, even though it was one of the shortest in years." Television critic John Carman of the San Francisco Chronicle wrote, "Even with a rookie host, Steve Martin, the Academy Awards show was long on decorum and disappointingly short on verve."

Ratings and reception
The American telecast on ABC drew in an average of 42.9 million people over its length, which was a 7% decrease from the previous year's ceremony. An estimated 72.2 million total viewers watched all or part of the awards. The show also earned lower Nielsen ratings compared to the previous ceremony with 26.2% of households watching over a 40 share. In addition, it garnered a lower 1849 demo rating with a 17.8 rating among viewers in that demographic.

In July 2001, the ceremony presentation received eight nominations at the 53rd Primetime Emmys. Two months later, the ceremony won one of those nominations for Outstanding Sound Mixing For A Variety Or Music Series Or Special (Edward J. Greene, Tom Vicari, Bob Douglass).

In Memoriam
The annual In Memoriam tribute, presented by actor John Travolta, honored the following people.

Douglas Fairbanks Jr. – Actor
Marie Windsor – Actress
Beah Richards – Actress
Edward Anhalt – Screenwriter
Billy Barty – Actor
Julius Epstein – Screenwriter
George Montgomery – Actor
Ring Lardner Jr. – Screenwriter
Steve Reeves – Actor and body builder
Jean Peters – Actress
Vittorio Gassman – Actor
Jean-Pierre Aumont – Actor
Dale Evans – Actress and singer
Gwen Verdon – Actress and dancer
Stanley Kramer – Producer, Director
Jack Nitzsche – Composer
Harold Nicholas – Tap dancer
Howard W. Koch – Producer, Academy President
Loretta Young – Actress
Richard Farnsworth – Actor and stuntman
John Gielgud – Actor
Jason Robards, Jr. – Actor
Claire Trevor – Actress
Alec Guinness – Actor
Walter Matthau – Actor and comedian

See also

 7th Screen Actors Guild Awards
 21st Golden Raspberry Awards
 43rd Grammy Awards
 53rd Primetime Emmy Awards
 54th British Academy Film Awards
 55th Tony Awards
 58th Golden Globe Awards
 List of submissions to the 73rd Academy Awards for Best Foreign Language Film

 Notes 
A: The two previous directors to have done so are: Frank Lloyd and Michael Curtiz
B: Z and Life Is Beautiful'' were the two previous films to have accomplished this feat.

References

Bibliography

External links
Official websites
 Academy Awards Official website
 The Academy of Motion Picture Arts and Sciences Official website
 Oscar's Channel at YouTube (run by the Academy of Motion Picture Arts and Sciences)
 

News resources
 Oscars 2001 BBC News
 Academy Awards coverage CNN

Analysis
 2000 Academy Awards Winners and History Filmsite
 Academy Awards, USA: 2001 Internet Movie Database

2000 film awards
2001 in American cinema
Academy Awards ceremonies
2001 in Los Angeles
March 2001 events in the United States
2001 awards in the United States
Television shows directed by Louis J. Horvitz